Gribskoye is a rural locality (a selo) and the administrative center of Gribskoy Selsoviet of Blagoveshchensky District, Amur Oblast, Russia. The population was 1,000 as of 2018. There are 36 streets.

Geography 
Gribskoye is located 28 km southeast of Blagoveshchensk (the district's administrative centre) by road. Volkovo is the nearest rural locality.

References 

Rural localities in Blagoveshchensky District, Amur Oblast